Numerous horse-drawn waggonways were constructed in Scotland during the Industrial Revolution, mainly in connection with the iron and coal-mining industries of the Central Belt.

The earliest railways, beginning with the Tranent to Cockenzie Waggonway in 1722, had wooden rails, and several lines had been built by the time the first cast-iron rails were produced in 1767.

Many of the later waggonways were built to the Scotch gauge of 4 ft 6 in (1,372 mm), and were subsequently converted to standard-gauge steam railways.

References

Priestley's Navigable Rivers and Canals, Joseph Priestley 1831
National Library of Scotland: Map images
Baxter, Bertram (1966). Stone Blocks and Iron Rails. David & Charles
 
Thomas & Turnock, John & Thomas (1971). A Regional History of the Railways of Great Britain. Volume 6 Scotland the Lowlands and the Borders. David & Charles

Horse-drawn railways
Waggonways in Scotland